The Dr. Anna E. and Andrew A. Johnstone House  (also known as the Royal House) is a historic house in Des Moines, Iowa, United States.  Built in 1887, the Queen Anne-style house was individually listed on the National Register of Historic Places in 1996.  It was included as a contributing property in the Polk County Homestead and Trust Company Addition Historic District in 2016.

It was a 10-room house, on a triple lot.

Anna E. Johnstone was a teacher before marrying.  Andrew A. Johnstone owned a china and glassware store in downtown Des Moines.  They had two daughters.  Andrew died of a stroke in 1892.  Anna sold Andrew's business, moved with the children to a rented apartment, and rented out the house.  She sold insurance and real estate and returned to school, receiving a medical degree in 1900 and becoming a doctor of osteopathy, and one of the first women to accomplish that.  She moved back into the house and used part of it to operate her osteopathy practice.

Anna was a student of Dr. Summerfield S. Still, who ran an osteopathic hospital and school in downtown Des Moines, and lived in North Des Moines.

The house was still in the family in 2013: it was owned and occupied by Jon Royal, a great-grandson of Anna E. and Andrew A Johnstone.

Anna Johnstone died in 1848.

References

External links

Queen Anne architecture in Iowa
Houses on the National Register of Historic Places in Iowa
National Register of Historic Places in Des Moines, Iowa
Houses completed in 1887
Houses in Des Moines, Iowa
Individually listed contributing properties to historic districts on the National Register in Iowa